Ignacio Sebastián Carruega (born 1 September 1996) is an Argentine professional footballer who plays as a midfielder for Sacachispas.

Career
Almirante Brown gave Carruega his start in senior football. Osvaldo Rodríguez promoted the midfielder into the club's first-team during the 2015 season in Primera B Metropolitana, as he made five appearances off the substitutes bench; with his debut coming versus Deportivo Merlo in September. His first start came in a 1–1 draw away to San Telmo on 29 April 2016, which was followed by his first goal on 9 May against Atlanta. Carruega netted four times two seasons later in 2017–18. September 2019 saw Carruega head to Mexico to join Alebrijes de Oaxaca of Ascenso MX.

In March 2020, Carruega joined Sacachispas.

Career statistics
.

References

External links

1996 births
Living people
People from Lomas de Zamora Partido
Argentine footballers
Association football midfielders
Argentine expatriate footballers
Expatriate footballers in Mexico
Argentine expatriate sportspeople in Mexico
Primera B Metropolitana players
Club Almirante Brown footballers
Alebrijes de Oaxaca players
Sacachispas Fútbol Club players
Sportspeople from Buenos Aires Province